Michaëlla Krajicek and Taylor Townsend are the defending champions, however Krajicek chose to compete in Limoges instead.

Townsend played alongside Jessica Pegula, but they lost in the final to Sofia Kenin and Anastasiya Komardina, 7–5, 5–7, [11–9].

Seeds

Draw

References
Main Draw

Waco Showdown - Doubles